Wilfrid Bruno Nantel,  (November 8, 1857 – May 22, 1940) was a Canadian politician.

Career
Born in Saint-Jérôme, Canada East, the son of Guillaume Nantel and Adélaïde Desjardins, he was a lawyer before first running unsuccessfully for the House of Commons of Canada as a Conservative candidate in the Quebec riding of Terrebonne in the 1904 federal election. He was elected in the 1908 election and re-elected in the 1911 election. From 1911 to 1912, he was the Minister of Mines. From 1911 to 1914, he was the Minister of Inland Revenue. From 1914 to 1924, he was an Assistant Chief Commissioner of the Board of Railway Commissioners and Transport Commissioners.

His older brother, Guillaume-Alphonse Nantel, was also a politician.

Notes

External links
 

1857 births
1940 deaths
Conservative Party of Canada (1867–1942) MPs
Members of the House of Commons of Canada from Quebec
Members of the King's Privy Council for Canada
People from Saint-Jérôme
French Quebecers